Graham Vivian Marsh MBE (born 14 January 1944) is a retired professional golfer who was one of the leading Australian players of his generation. During his career he won more than 70 tournaments around the world, including 10 on the European Tour and 20 on the Japan Golf Tour, plus two senior major championships.

Early life 
Marsh was born in Kalgoorlie, Western Australia. He attended the University of Western Australia and Claremont Teachers College before turning professional in 1969. Marsh is a former mathematics teacher. His brother was cricketer Rod Marsh.

Professional career 
Marsh's first professional tournament was in May 1968 at South Australian Open. He finished in solo third place. Peter Thomson, writing about the event for The Age, stated that "this talented player seems sure to finish higher before long." In 1970 he played well at New Zealand's Caltex Tournament. Entering the par-5 18th hole he was tied for the lead with Maurice Bembridge and Terry Kendall. However, he could only make par. His competitors played the hole under par to defeat him. Marsh finished in solo third at 287, one behind.

Throughout the 1970s and 1980s Marsh was a regular winner on the European Tour, the Japan Golf Tour and the PGA Tour of Australasia. He also won several events in Asia outside Japan, winning the Asia Golf Circuit overall title in 1972 and 1973, and one on the U.S.-based PGA Tour, the 1977 Heritage Classic. Marsh had an outstanding win rate on the European Tour, where he accumulated eleven titles even though he never played more than seven events in Europe in a season. He also won the Colgate World Match Play Championship, which was not an official money European Tour event at the time, in England in 1977. He had 56 wins in all in his regular career, making him one of the most successful players of his era not to win a major championship. He was voted Australian Sportsman of the year in 1977 and awarded Golf Digest Rookie of the Year the same year, 13 years before the PGA Tour Rookie of the Year award was instituted by the PGA Tour.

As a senior, Marsh has played extensively in the United States on the Champions Tour winning six events including two senior majors: the 1997 U.S. Senior Open and the 1999 Tradition. He has also won the Japan Senior Open twice.

Marsh is also active in golf course design through Graham Marsh Golf Design which he established in 1986. The company's early projects were in Australia and Japan, but it later branched out to other parts of Asia, Europe and the United States. His work has included courses such as The Vines Resort (Perth), Palm Meadows Resort(Gold Coast) Old Silo (Kentucky), Twin Creeks Golf and Country Club (New South Wales) and Terrey Hills Golf & Country Club just to name a few.

In 1984, Marsh was made an MBE for services to golf. He is a past chairman of the PGA Tour of Australasia.

In 2004, he became the first player on the four main golf tours (PGA Tour, European Tour, Champions Tour or the European Senior Tour) to ace the same hole twice in a tournament when he had a hole-in-one on No. 11 at Royal Portrush Golf Club during the 2004 Senior British Open Championship.

His younger brother Rod Marsh was a distinguished Australian cricketer and coach.

Professional wins (69)

PGA Tour wins (1)

European Tour wins (10)

European Tour playoff record (0–1)

Japan Golf Tour wins (20)

*Note: Tournament shortened to 54 holes due to weather.

Japan Golf Tour playoff record (5–5)

PGA Tour of Australasia wins (7)

PGA Tour of Australasia playoff record (1–1)

Asia Golf Circuit wins (5)

Other European wins (3)
1970 Swiss Open
1977 Lancome Trophy, Colgate World Match Play Championship

Other Japan wins (5)
1972 Dunlop Tournament
1973 Japan vs Australia Match individual
1975 Dunlop Wizard
1976 Dunlop Wizard
1977 Dunlop Wizard

Other Australasian wins (7)
1966 Nedlands Masters (as an amateur)
1967 Nedlands Masters (as an amateur)
1968 Western Australian Open
1969 Western Australia PGA Championship
1970 Wattie's Tournament
1971 Spalding Masters
1976 Western Australian Open

Other Asian wins (1)
1976 Dunhill International Match-Play (Hong Kong)

Champions Tour wins (6)

*Note: The 1999 Tradition was shortened to 36 holes due to snow.

Champions Tour playoff record (0–1)

Other senior wins (4)
1997 Liberty Mutual Legends of Golf (with John Bland)
1998 Japan Senior Open
1999 Japan Senior Open
2010 Liberty Mutual Legends of Golf – Raphael Division (with John Bland)

Results in major championships

CUT = missed the half-way cut
"T" indicates a tie for a place

Summary

Most consecutive cuts made – 16 (1978 PGA – 1991 Open Championship)
Longest streak of top-10s – 2 (twice)

Champions Tour major championships

Wins (2)

Team appearances
Dunhill Cup (representing Australia): 1985 (winners)
Four Tours World Championship (representing Australasia): 1985, 1986, 1987, 1988, 1991

See also
Fall 1976 PGA Tour Qualifying School graduates
List of golfers with most Japan Golf Tour wins
List of golfers with most European Tour wins

References

External links

Graham Marsh Golf Design

Australian male golfers
PGA Tour of Australasia golfers
European Tour golfers
Japan Golf Tour golfers
PGA Tour golfers
PGA Tour Champions golfers
Winners of senior major golf championships
Golf course architects
Australian Members of the Order of the British Empire
Western Australian Sports Star of the Year winners
Sportsmen from Western Australia
Golfers from Perth, Western Australia
People from Kalgoorlie
1944 births
Living people